Altiplano is a Canadian-Chilean experimental short documentary film, directed by Malena Szlam and released in 2018. Shot in the Altiplano region of Chile, the film depicts the region's unique landscape using various filmmaking techniques to portray it as alien and surreal.

The film premiered at the 2018 Toronto International Film Festival. It was subsequently named to TIFF's year-end Canada's Top Ten list for short films in 2018.

References

External links

2018 films
2018 short documentary films
Canadian short documentary films
Chilean documentary films
Films shot in Chile
Chilean short films
Canadian avant-garde and experimental short films
2010s Canadian films